1949 Meistaradeildin was the seventh season of Meistaradeildin, the top tier of the Faroese football league system. The league was in a league format, having six teams; every team played against each other once. TB Tvøroyri won its second championship in the season.

Overview

Results

External links
Faroe Islands League Final Tables by webalice.it
Faroese champions by RSSSF

Meistaradeildin seasons
Faroe
Faroe